Kudumbasree Travels  is a 2011 Malayalam comedy film directed by Kiran starring Jayaram and Bhavana in the lead roles. It is a family oriented film, with Jayaram playing the role of Aravindan, a bus service owner who hails from a family of Chakyarkoothu artists. Kudumbasree Travels marks the debut of Kiran and Thomas Thoppikodi, who are well known faces in TV serials. The film also stars P. Sreekumar, Kottayam Nazeer, Jagathy Sreekumar, Janardhanan, Mamukkoya, Maniyanpilla Raju, K. P. A. C. Lalitha and Kalpana in other pivotal roles. The film started its shooting in September 2010 and major parts were filmed from Ottappalam. It released on 21 January 2011 in 54 centres. It received mostly negative reviews and was a commercial flop.

Plot
In the village of Chitirapuram resides Aravindan Chakyar aka Aravi, who is an exponent of Chakyarkoothu (A traditional Kerala dance form). Aravi's parents want him to get married. Aravi has no objections but one condition that the girl must also be an exponent of Chakyarkoothu. Chachu is Aravi's uncle. As per a tradition in Kerala, Chachu wants Aravi to marry his daughter, so that he can have a part of the wealth of Aravi's family. He thus tries to impress Aravi and his parents, who see through him and avoid him.

George Kutty, a marriage broker and Aravi's friend, brings a relation according to Aravi's demand. Aswathy is a dancer, and an exponent of Chakyarkoothu and lives in the city. She belongs to a rich family, who follow some traditions. Aravi meets her and their marriage is fixed, much to the dismay of Chachu.

Aravi and an ensemble, consisting of villagers, depart for the city in a bus named Kudumbasree Travels. Chachu joins them in order to stop the marriage. Along with him is Nettar, an astrologist, who is promised a sum for help.

At the same time, a girl named Sridevi is going to Kochi on a mission. Her father, a police officer, has been kidnapped by some men. They want Sridevi to bring a suitecase to the city. While waiting for a bus, some people who are waiting for Kudumbasree Travels to go to Aravi's marriage, mistake her for another girl Hemalatha. Sridevi decides to pose as Hemalatha and go to Kochi with the marriage group.

At Kochi, Ashwaty's cousin returns with an intention to marry Aswathy. He shocked to learn that Aswathy's marriage has been fixed with someone else. He decides to conspire with his friend and caretaker Adiyodi to wreck the marriage.

On the wedding day, the groom and team arrive late. In Kerala tradition, a marriage should be done within a Muhurtham or auspicious time. Aswathy's family believe that a marriage after the Muhurtham is bad luck. Aravi, due to interference from Chachu and the cousin, is unable to marry Aswathy.

An astrologer gives them another Muhurtham the next day. But it is only a minute long. Aravi and his team make all preparations to get on time. This time, the cousin injects a syringe containing medicine to make one unconscious into Aravi and the marriage is once again ruined. Aravi and his parents question Chachu, who denies any action.

Nettar sees that there is money in Hemalatha/Sridevi's bag and attempts to steal it by using an identical bag. During his escapade to get the money, he causes Aravi to fall on Sridevi. A picture of this is taken by a hotel caretaker. Nettar and Chachu decide to use the photo to convince both parties that Aravi has an affair with Sridevi/ Hemalatha.

The photo causes an outrage between both parties and the wedding is called off. Aswathy, who trusts Aravi, decides to elope with Aravi. At the same day, Sridevi also leaves. When both Aravi and Sridevi/Hemalatha are found missing, they are presumed to have eloped. That is when the truth about Hemalatha is also learned.

Aswathy is convinced by her cousin and Adiyodi that they will help her. But they reveal their plan to get Aswathy married to the cousin. Aswathy escapes and meets up with Aravi. In an ensuing comical fight with the cousin and his men, they rescue Sridevi's father from the kidnappers. They then join with Aravi's ensemble.

Nettar followed Sridevi to get her bag and grabs it. When he reunites with everyone, everyone goes after the money. Aravi, frustrated, grabs the bag and throws it away. It is revealed to be a bomb and explodes. Nettar, at the sight of this, goes insane. Sridevi and her father thank Aravi for saving everyone and leave.

Aravi them takes his team in search of a temple to marry Aswathy. When no temple is found, Aravi and Aswathy decide to get married in front of some idols which are for sale. Aswathy's family also arrive and reveal that they know about Chachu and the cousin attempting to sabotage the wedding. With the consent of everyone, Aravi and Aswathy get married. The film ends as the newlywed couple of Aravi and Aswathy depart for Aravi's village with everyone aboard Kudumbasree Travels.

Cast
 Jayaram as Aravindan Chakyar/Aravi
 Bhavana as Aswathy
 Jagathy Sreekumar as Chachu, Aravindan's uncle
 P. Sreekumar as Chembakassery Govinda Chakyar, Aravindan's father
 Kottayam Nazeer as George Kutty, Aravindan's friend
 Maniyanpilla Raju as Nettar, the astrologist
 Radhika as Sreedevi / Hemalatha
 Mamukkoya as Makkar Kakka
 Narayanankutty
 Valsala Menon
 K. P. A. C. Lalitha as Bhavani, Aravindan's mother
 Kalpana as Khadeeja
 Janardhanan Mullasery Raveendra Chakyar
 Vettukili Prakash as Aravindan's friend
 Sidharth as Rajappan, the bus driver
 Kulappulli Leela as Kunjannamma
 Deepika Mohan

References

External links

 Kudumbasree Travels at Malayalam Movies.org

2011 films
2010s Malayalam-language films
2011 comedy films
Indian comedy films
Films shot in Ottapalam
Films shot in Kochi